Udom Taepanich, also stage name Nose, is a Thai stand-up comedian, artist and writer.

Taepanich was named as One of the best Persons of the Century in Performing Arts by Nation Publishing Group in 2000. He is well known for his stand-up comedy series Deaw 1-13.

Biography 
Taepanich was born on September 1, 1968, in Chonburi, Thailand. He is the son of Tongsuk Arilon and Somjit Taepanich and the second of three children.

Starting in 1993, Taepanich was a member of the Yutthakarn Kayubnguek Team.

Taepanich created a special program called "Moo" which showcased him and other Thai celebrities doing stand-up and also performing their arts. Taepanich has been called one of the most famous comedians in Thailand.

References

External links 
 

Udom Taepanich
1968 births
Living people
Udom Taepanich
Udom Taepanich
Udom Taepanich
People from Bangalore